The 2005 ARFU Asian Rugby Series was the second edition of a tournament created by Asian Rugby Football Union for national teams. It was also valid as first round of Asian qualification for 2007 Rugby World cup.

Tournament

First Division  
{| class="wikitable"
|-
!width=30|Pos.
!width=100|Team
!width=30|P
!width=30|W
!width=30|D
!width=30|Lost
!width=30|For
!width=30|Ag.
!width=40|Diff.
!width=30|Points
!width=300|Notes
|-
|- bgcolor=#ccffcc align=center
|1||align=left|||2||2||0||0||141||34||+107||4||
|- bgcolor=#ffffff align=center
|2||align=left|||2||1||0||1||87||53||+34||2||
|- bgcolor=#ffffCC align=center
|3||align=left|||2||0||0||2||6||147||-88||0||   relegated to next year's division 2
|}

Second division  
Valid also for 2007 Rugby World Cup – Asia qualification

{| class="wikitable"
|-
!width=30|Pos.
!width=100|Team
!width=30|P
!width=30|W
!width=30|D
!width=30|Lost
!width=30|For
!width=30|Ag.
!width=40|Diff.
!width=30|Points
!width=300|Notes
|-
|- bgcolor=#ccffcc align=center
|1||align=left|Arabian Gulf||2||2||0||0||54||48||+6||4||  promoted to next year's division 1
|- bgcolor=#ffffff align=center
|2||align=left|||2||1||0||1||44||43||+1||2||
|- bgcolor=#ffffCC align=center
|3||align=left|||2||0||0||2||45||52||-7||0||   relegated to next year's division 3
|}

Third division 
Valid also for 2007 Rugby World Cup – Asia qualification

Pool A 
{| class="wikitable"
|-
!width=30|Pos.
!width=100|Team
!width=30|P
!width=30|W
!width=30|D
!width=30|Lost
!width=30|For
!width=30|Ag.
!width=40|Diff.
!width=30|Points
!width=300|Notes
|-
|- bgcolor=#ccffcc align=center
|1||align=left|||2||2||0||0||82||55||+27||4||   promoted to final
|- bgcolor=#ffffff align=center
|2||align=left|||2||1||0||1||64||61||+3||2||
|- bgcolor=#ffffCC align=center
|3||align=left|||2||0||0||2||65||95||-30||0||   relegated to next year's division 4
|}

Pool B 
{| class="wikitable"
|-
!width=30|Pos.
!width=100|Team
!width=30|P
!width=30|W
!width=30|D
!width=30|Lost
!width=30|For
!width=30|Ag.
!width=40|Diff.
!width=30|Points
!width=300|Notes
|-
|- bgcolor=#ccffcc align=center
|1||align=left|||3||3||0||0||135||31||+104||6||   promoted to final
|- bgcolor=#ffffff align=center
|2||align=left|||3||2||0||1||78||56||+22||4||   relegated to next year's division 4
|- bgcolor=#ffffff align=center
|3||align=left|||3||1||0||2||60||111||-51||2||  relegated to next year's division 4
|- bgcolor=#ffffff align=center
|4||align=left|||3||0||0||3||29||104||-75||0||  relegated to next year's division 5
|}

Final 
{| class="wikitable"
|-
!width=30|Pos.
!width=100|Team
!width=30|P
!width=30|W
!width=30|D
!width=30|Lost
!width=30|For
!width=30|Ag.
!width=40|Diff.
!width=30|Points
!width=300|Notes
|-
|- bgcolor=#ccffcc align=center
|1||align=left|||2||2||0||0||43||37||+6||2||   promoted to next year's division 2
|- bgcolor=#ffffff align=center
|2||align=left|||2||0||0||2||37||43||-6||2||
|- bgcolor=#ffffCC align=center
|}

References

2005
2005 rugby union tournaments for national teams
2005 in Asian rugby union